The men's 50 kilometres race walk at the 1938 European Athletics Championships was held in Paris, France, on 4 September 1938.

Medalists

Results

Final
4 September

Participation
According to an unofficial count, 16 athletes from 11 countries participated in the event.

 (1)
 (1)
 (2)
 (2)
 (2)
 (1)
 (1)
 (1)
 (1)
 (2)
 (2)

References

50 kilometres race walk
Racewalking at the European Athletics Championships